James Francis Howard Jr. (born May 3, 1948) is a Professor of Neurology and Medicine at University of North Carolina at Chapel Hill.

Career
Howard was born on May 3, 1948 in Bellows Falls, Vermont.  He received a BA in 1970 and a M.D. in 1974, both from the University of Vermont.

Howard became an Assistant Professor of Neurology and Medicine at the University of North Carolina at Chapel Hill in 1979, he was promoted to Associate Professor in 1985, and promoted to full Professor in 1992. He is also an Adjunct Professor of Clinical Sciences (Neurology) at the North Carolina State University.

Awards
In 2003 a chair was endowed in Professor Howard's name for the exceptional care given to a member of the Broyhill family in the years before. The intent is to support clinical research into myasthenia gravis and other neuromuscular disorders.

References

External links
 Official home page at UNC
 List of papers on Google Scholar

American neurologists
American medical researchers
North Carolina State University people
1948 births
Living people
People from Bellows Falls, Vermont
University of North Carolina at Chapel Hill faculty
University of Vermont alumni